Galice , or Galice-Applegate or Upper Rogue River, is an extinct Athabaskan language once spoken by the two Upper Rogue River Athabaskan tribes, the Galice tribe (Taltushtuntede / Tal-tvsh-dan-ni - "Galice Creek people") and Applegate tribe (Nabiltse, Dakubetede) of southwestern Oregon. It was spoken on the "Galice Creek and Applegate River, tributaries of the Rogue River in southwestern Oregon. There were at least two distinct dialects the Galice Creek and Applegate, but only the Galice Creek dialect is well documented."

It is one of the languages of the Oregon Athabaskan (Tolowa–Galice) cluster of the Pacific Coast Athabaskan languages.

Phonology 

These vowels can appear in clusters and can also be elongated.

Galice also has several rules regarding the placements of consonants.

Morphology 

Morphemes in Galice can be placed in one of four categories: stems, prefixes, postpositions and enclitics. Prefixes can be either derivational or grammatical, where the derivational helps make up a word base and is nearly always in the shape of CV. Grammatical prefixes are less common but have more flexibility in their shape 

Galice has three major word classes: nouns, verbs, and articles. Nouns can only be inflected for the possessive, in which case a prefix is added. Verbs may be inflected for person and number for neuter verbs and additionally for aspect in active and passive verbs. Nouns can come in four different types: a simple noun, which is a single stem morpheme; complex nouns, which has an apparent sequence; nominalized verbs; and compounds, which contain two (and sometimes three) noun bases in any of the other three categories.

Verbs in Galice are made up of a stem preceded by one or more grammatical prefixes and zero or more derivational prefixes. There are 10 positions in a verb form and each can only be filled by specific types of prefixes and may not be filled at all.

Number and Person

Number 

Number is not ordinarily marked in the noun. Those that are tend to be kinship terms and are marked with the enclitics –yoo or –kee.

Person 

Galice has 1st, 2nd, 3rd person. 1st and 2nd person singular and plural are marked in position 8. 3rd person remains unmarked in the singular, but in the plural form, it is marked in position 4 by haa- or ¬hii-. 1st person singular is marked by š- in all occurrences. 1st person plural can be marked with id- or i- depending in the class of the verb. Nasalization occurs in position eight when denoting 2nd person singular, while2nd person plural can be marked with oʔo-, ʔa-,ʔe-, or ʔo- depending on the preceding prefix.

Classificatory Verbs 
Galice has a relatively tame number of classificatory prefixes for its verb stems. It comes in with a modest 7 classes. In Galice, the class prefix comes just before the verb stem, in position nine.

References

External links 

 Galice (Nabiltse, Applegate Creek Indians)
 OLAC resources in and about the Galice language
 Galice basic lexicon at the Global Lexicostatistical Database

Pacific Coast Athabaskan languages
Extinct languages of North America
Languages extinct in the 1960s
1963 disestablishments in Oregon